Shukshin is a Russian masculine surname, its feminine counterpart is Shukshina. It may refer to
Lidiya Fedoseyeva-Shukshina (born 1938), Russian actress, wife of Vasily Shukshin
Maria Shukshina (born 1967), Russian actress, daughter of Lidiya and Vasily
Olga Shukshina (born 1969), Russian actress, daughter of Lidiya and Vasily
Vasily Shukshin (1929–1974), Russian actor, writer, screenwriter and movie director

Russian-language surnames